Jeongganjang Cup is a Go competition sponsored by Jeongganjang. The current title holder is Team Korea.

Winners

International Go competitions